Maja Bogdanović (born Маја Богдановић,  in Belgrade, Serbia ) is a Paris-based Serbian cellist who also lives part of the year in Chicago, Illinois.

She won first prize at the Aldo Parisot Cello Competition and also competed successfully at the Gaspar Cassado International Competition.  Playing Ivan Jevtic's Cello Symphony, Bogdanovic  performed at the Serbian Academy of Sciences and Arts jubilee in 2021.  She made her American debut in 2017.

References

External links
Official website
Cassado Cello Competition Japan
Great Mountains Music Festival

1982 births
Living people
Musicians from Belgrade
Serbian classical cellists
Women cellists
Serbian expatriates in the United States
21st-century Serbian musicians
21st-century women musicians
21st-century cellists